Mr. Wonderful is an album by jazz organist Johnny "Hammond" Smith which was recorded in 1963 and released on the Riverside label.

Reception

The Allmusic site awarded the album 3 stars calling it "A fine set that holds some appeal for the straight jazz crowd as well as the organ soul-jazz clique".

Track listing
All compositions by Johnny "Hammond" Smith except as indicated
 "Blues for De-De" - 4:59
 "Mr. Wonderful" (Jerry Bock, George David Weiss, Larry Holofcener) - 5:19 
 "Cyra" - 4:20 
 "Lambert's Lodge" - 3:40 
 "Love Letters" (Victor Young, Edward Heyman) - 5:40
 "Blues on Sunday" - 4:46
 "Departure" - 5:52
 "Opus 2" - 4:28

Personnel
Johnny "Hammond" Smith - Hammond B3 organ
Sonny Williams - trumpet
Houston Person — tenor saxophone 
Eddie McFadden - guitar (tracks 1, 4, 7 & 8)
Leo Stevens - drums

References

1963 albums
Johnny "Hammond" Smith albums
Riverside Records albums
Albums produced by Orrin Keepnews